Pramod Sah is a Nepalese politician, belonging to the People's Socialist Party, Nepal currently serving as the member of the 1st Federal Parliament of Nepal. In the 2017 Nepalese general election he was elected from the Sarlahi 1 constituency, securing 22036 (33.79%) votes.

Controversies
 In 2019 Sha was arrested from Tribhuvan International Airport for vandalising Buddha Air's counter in Janakpur. He was protesting against Buddha Air for his concern over the health a kidney patient, his co-passenger.

References

Nepal MPs 2017–2022
Living people
Nepal Sadbhawana Party politicians
Rastriya Janata Party Nepal politicians
People's Socialist Party, Nepal politicians
1978 births